Fareed Ahmad can refer to:

 Fareed Ahmad (cricketer) (born 1994), Afghan cricketer
 Fareed Ahmad (field hockey) (born 1989), Pakistani field hockey player

See also
 Fareed Ahmed (born 1989), Pakistani field hockey player